Daniel Gaunt, born 27 February 1985, in Auckland, is a New Zealand racing driver. Owner of Game Over Auckland

Formula Racing 
After rising through the ranks of New Zealand Formula Ford, which included a third-place finish in the 2002 New Zealand Grand Prix, Gaunt moved to Australia, competing in the Formula 4000 category and winning the 2003 Australian Drivers' Championship. With Formula 4000 collapsing, the title did not lead anywhere and Gaunt returned to New Zealand. After a win in the 2004 Lady Wigram Trophy driving a Dallara F3, Gaunt moved on to compete in the inaugural Toyota Racing Series, finishing third in the final standings. A season in Champ Car Atlantics followed with the Paul Newman owned Newman/Wachs Racing. After single race as the back-up driver for A1 Team New Zealand Gaunt returned to New Zealand Gaunt won the 2006 Toyota Racing Series title.

Sedan Racing 

Drives in 2008 proved slim with guest drives in Toyota Racing Series, Australian Carrera Cup and a late season drive with Team Kiwi Racing in V8 Supercars. Over the 2008/09 NZ motor racing summer season Gaunt competed in the Porsche GT3 Cup Challenge with the XXX Motorsport team, finishing 3rd overall and then stepped up to a full-time drive for McElrea Racing in the Australian Fujitsu Development Series. From there he was recruited by Lucas Dumbrell Motorsport to drive in the 2010 V8 Supercar Championship Series but was replaced mid season. In 2011 he is driving for Stone Brothers Racing satellite team James Rosenberg Racing for the Phillip Island and Bathurst endurance races.

Career results

Champ Car Atlantic

Complete V8 Supercar results

Complete Bathurst 1000 results

References 

 Racing Reference profile
 Driver Database profile
 Motorsport.com news and photos

1984 births
New Zealand racing drivers
Living people
Supercars Championship drivers
A1 Grand Prix Rookie drivers
Indy Lights drivers
Toyota Racing Series drivers
Formula Holden drivers
Sportspeople from Auckland
V8SuperTourer drivers
Asian Le Mans Series drivers
Eurasia Motorsport drivers
Australian Endurance Championship drivers
Kelly Racing drivers
A1 Grand Prix drivers
Nismo drivers
Stone Brothers Racing drivers
Tasman Motorsports drivers
Newman Wachs Racing drivers